Croatian football clubs have participated in UEFA competitions since 1958. Before 1992 Croatia was a part of Yugoslavia. Therefore, Croatian teams represented this country and did not always have a guaranteed spot in European competitions. Dinamo Zagreb are the only Croatian club that won a European trophy by winning the Inter-Cities Fairs Cup 1966–67 season.

All statistics and records are accurate as of 24 February 2022.

Statistics
As of 2 September 2022.

 Most European Cup / Champions League competitions appeared in: 24 – Dinamo Zagreb 
 Most UEFA Cup / Europa League competitions appeared in: 28 – Hajduk Split 
 Most Cup Winners' Cup competitions appeared in: 9 – Dinamo Zagreb 
 Most Intertoto Cup competitions appeared in: 5 – Slaven Belupo
 Most Europa Conference League competitions appeared in: 2 – Hajduk Split, Osijek, Rijeka 
 Most competitions appeared in overall: 59 – Dinamo Zagreb
 First match played: Dinamo Zagreb 2–2 Dukla Prague (1958–59 European Cup PR)
 Most matches played: 319 – Dinamo Zagreb 
 Most match wins: 131 – Dinamo Zagreb
 Most match draws: 67 – Dinamo Zagreb
 Most match losses: 121 – Dinamo Zagreb

 Biggest win (match): 8 goals
 GÍ Gøta 0–8 Hajduk Split (2002–03 UEFA Cup QR) 
 Biggest win (aggregate): 11 goals
 Dinamo Zagreb 11–0 B68 Toftir (1993–94 UEFA Champions League PR)
 Hajduk Split 11–0 GÍ Gøta (2002–03 UEFA Cup QR) 
 Biggest defeat (match): 6 goals
 Dinamo Zagreb 1–7 Lyon (2011–12 UEFA Champions League group stage)
 Ajax 6–0 Hajduk Split (1993–94 European Cup Winners' Cup R1)
 PAOK 6–0 Lokomotiva (2015–16 UEFA Europa League QR2)
 Biggest defeat (aggregate): 8 goals
 Hajduk Split 0–8 Debreceni (2005–06 UEFA Champions League QR2)

European champions

UEFA country coefficient and ranking
For the 2023–24 UEFA competitions, the associations were allocated places according to their 2022 UEFA country coefficients, which take into account their performance in European competitions from 2017–18 to 2021–22. In the 2022 rankings that are used for the 2023–24 European competitions, Croatia's coefficient points total is 27.150. Croatia is ranked by UEFA as the 19th association in Europe out of 55.

 17   27.250
 18   27.175
 19   27.150
 20  27.100
 21  26.375
 Full list

UEFA country coefficient history
(As of 2 September 2022), Source: Bert Kassies website.

Appearances in UEFA competitions

Apps. = Appearances; Pld = Matches played; W = Matches won; D = Matches drawn; L = Matches lost; EC = European Cup; UCL = UEFA Champions League; UC = UEFA Cup; UEL = UEFA Europa League; CWC = UEFA Cup Winners' Cup; UIC = UEFA Intertoto Cup.

Notes

₳: This NK Varaždin (1931–2015), which was named NK Varteks during most of its UEFA matches, no longer exists. An unassociated NK Varteks (2011), and an unassociated NK Varaždin (2012) now exist, though neither has yet qualified for a UEFA tournament

Competitions

Active
PR = Preliminary round; QR = Qualifying round; R1/R2 = First/Second round; QR1/QR2/QR3 = First/Second/Third qualifying round; R32 = Round of 32; R16 = Round of 16; QF = Quarter-finals; GS = Group stage; PO = Playoff.

European Cup / UEFA Champions League

UEFA Cup / UEFA Europa League
PR = Preliminary round; QR = Qualifying round; R1/R2 = First/Second round; R32 = Round of 32; R16 = Round of 16; QR1/QR2/QR3 = First/Second/Third qualifying round; QF = Quarter-finals; SF = Semi-finals; F = Final; GS = Group stage; PO = Playoff

UEFA Europa Conference League

R32 = Round of 32; R16 = Round of 16; QR1/QR2/QR3 = First/Second/Third qualifying round; QF = Quarter-finals; SF = Semi-finals; F = Final; GS = Group stage; PO = Playoff

Defunct

Cup Winners' Cup
QR = Qualifying round; R1/R2 = First/Second round; QF = Quarter-finals; SF = Semi-finals.
† Game originally finished 2–0 for Hajduk Split, but was later awarded 0–3 for Marseille because of crowd trouble. In addition, Hajduk was banned for two years from all European competitions.

UEFA Intertoto Cup
GS = Group stage; R1/R2/R3 = First/Second/Third round; SF = Semi-finals.

Record by country of opposition
Updated on 14 September 2022.

Record by opponent
The list only includes those clubs that Croatian clubs have faced in four or more UEFA matches. Updated on 14 September 2022.

References

External links
UEFA Website
Rec.Sport.Soccer Statistics Foundation

European football clubs in international competitions